Events in the year 2004 in Kerala

Incumbents 

Governors of Kerala -

 Sikander Bakht (till February),
 T. N. Chaturvedi (additional charge from February–June),
 R.L. Bhatia (from June)

Chief ministers of Kerala -

 A. K. Antony (till August),
 Oommen Chandy (from August)

Events 

 February 10 - Chief minister of Kerala A. K. Antonyinaugurates the second reach of between Bolghatty Island and Vallarpadam.
 May 4 - A sexagenarian named Bhavani Amma, aged 62 give birth to a baby boy at Samad IVF, Thiruvananthapuram through Embryo transfer and In vitro fertilisation.
 May 10 - 2004 Indian general election held in Kerala as part of the last phase of general elections.
 June 15 - Javed Ghulam Sheikh (a.k.a. Pranesh Pillai) a native of Nooranad, alleged as terrorist shot dead in an Encounter killing by Gujarat Police near Ahmedabad as part of Ishrat Jahan case.
 August 19 - Rajani S. Anand, a 20 year old engineering student in the College of Engineering, Adoor hailing from Vellarada commits suicide by jumping from 6th floor of Commissioner for Entrance Examinations Kerala, Thiruvananthapuram following her inability to pay hostel fees of rs. 1,200 and reluctance of Indian Overseas Bank to disburse Student loan.
 August 29 - Chief minister of Kerala A. K. Antony tenders resignation due to poor performance of his party in Parliament elections.
 August 31 - Oommen Chandy becomes the Chief minister of Kerala.
 December 26 - Nearly 155 killed in Kollam, Alappuzha and Ernakulam districts due to 2004 Indian Ocean earthquake and tsunami.

Deaths 

 February 23 - Sikander Bakht, 85, Governor of Kerala.
 April 17 - Soundarya, 31, South Indian actress.
 May 19 - E. K. Nayanar, 85, Former Chief minister of Kerala.

See also 

 History of Kerala
 2004 in India

References 

2000s in Kerala